WBC The Palace is a complex of two residential skyscrapers in Busan, South Korea consisting of three office towers and one residential tower. Tower 1 and 2 were both completed in 2011.

References

External links
  on CTBUH Skyscraper Center
  on CTBUH Skyscraper Center

Skyscrapers in Busan
Residential skyscrapers in South Korea